Svea Rike is a 1997 turn-based strategy video game based on the history of Sweden, which became an inspiration to the later-established franchise "Crusader Kings". The title roughly translates to "Swedish Realm". A sequel, Svea Rike II, was also made.

All wording and menus are in Swedish.

References

1997 video games
Classic Mac OS games
Turn-based strategy video games
Video games based on board games
Video games developed in Sweden
Video games set in Sweden
Windows games